Bernard Morris Weiner (January 24, 1918 – October 25, 2004) was a professional American football player who played offensive lineman for two seasons for the Brooklyn Dodgers.

References

1918 births
American football offensive linemen
Brooklyn Dodgers (NFL) players
Kansas State Wildcats football players
players of American football from New Jersey
2004 deaths